Andrew Green is an American former professional darts player who competed in events of the British Darts Organisation (BDO) in the 1970s and 1980s.

Career
Green played in the 1979 BDO World Darts Championship, where he lost in the first round to Alan Glazier. Later, he made a return to Jollees in the 1983 BDO World Darts Championship, to again lose in the first round to Dave Whitcombe. 
He played the 1982 WDF Pacific Cup singles, losing in the final to Terry O'Dea.

World Championship results

BDO
 1979: Last 24: (lost to Alan Glazier 1–2)
 1983: Last 32: (lost to Dave Whitcombe 1–2)

External links
Profile and stats on Darts Database

American darts players
Living people
British Darts Organisation players
Year of birth missing (living people)